Sylvia and Bird is a 2009 picture book by Catherine Rayner. It is about the friendship between a dragon, called Sylvia, and a little yellow bird.

Reception
Booktrust described Sylvia and Bird as "a story that gently explores themes of expectation, loneliness, friendship and valuing others". and The Daily Telegraph called it a "strange and simple story".

Kirkus Reviews, in its review, wrote "Though pleasant enough, no new ground is broken on the subject, and the plot turns are far from organic." and concluded "In all, though, it may impress the adult eye more than a child's." 

Sylvia and Bird has also been reviewed by Booklist, Literary Review, the Irish Examiner, and The Scotsman.

See also
Solomon Crocodile, another picture book by Rayner

References

External links

Library holdings of Sylvia and Bird
Rayner discusses Sylvia and Bird with Scottish Book Trust

2009 children's books
British children's books
British picture books
Books about birds
Books about dragons
Children's books about friendship